I